Bradybaeninae is a taxonomic subfamily of medium-sized to small land snails, terrestrial pulmonate gastropod mollusks in the family Camaenidae, superfamily Helicoidea.

These snails are found mainly in Asia, with only one species occurring in Northwestern Europe: Fruticicola fruticum.

The name of the subfamily and the genus Bradybaena is derived from the Greek words bradus (= slow) and baino (= walk), meaning "slow walker".

Molecular phylogenetic studies from 2007 showed that bradybaenids are closely related with the Camaenidae, which are currently recognized as a distinct family. In these studies both Bradybaenidae and Camaenidae are mutually polyphyletic, together forming a monophyletic group, however. This finding suggests that the distinction of both families as based essentially on the absence (Camaenidae) or presence (Bradybaenidae) of a diverticulum, is arbitrary. This anatomical structure was apparently lost (or was gained) in several groups in convergence and is therefore not suitable for the delimitation of natural groups.

Anatomy 
Some genera of snails in this family create and use love darts as part of their mating behavior. The dart sac contains one to two glands. They are also defined by missing a diverticulum.

In this subfamily, the number of haploid chromosomes lies between 26 and 30 (according to the values in this table).

Taxonomy 
The following two subfamilies were recognized in the taxonomy of Bouchet & Rocroi (2005):
 subfamily Bradybaeninae Pilsbry, 1924
 tribe Aegistini Kuroda & Habe, 1949
 tribe Bradybaenini Pilsbry, 1934 - synonyms: Eulotidae Möllendorff, 1898; Fruticicolinae Kobelt, 1904; Buliminopsinae Hoffmann, 1928
 tribe Euhadrini Habe, Okutani & Nishiwaki, 1994
 subfamily Helicostylinae Ihering, 1909 - synonyms: Pfeifferiinae Gray, 1855; Cochlostylidae Möllendorff, 1890

The new taxonomy of the gastropods, published in 2017 and accepted by WoRMS, includes these subfamilies within the family Camaenidae:

Genera

Genera within the subfamily Bradybaeninae include:

subfamily Bradybaeninae - they are defined by the presence of two divided glands with one to two accessory sacs.
tribe Aegistini
 Aegista Albers, 1850
 Coelorus Pilsbry, 1900
 Lepidopisum Habe, 1957
 Mandarina Pilsbry, 1895
 Nesiohelix Kuroda & Emura, 1943 - for example Nesiohelix swinhoei
 Plecteulota Moellendorff, 1892
 Plectotropis - for example Plectotropis mackensii
 Trishoplita Jacobi, 1898

tribe Bradybaenini
 Acusta E. von Martens, 1860
 Ainohelix Kuroda & Taki, 1933
 Apatetes Gude, 1914
 Armandiella Ancey, 1901
 Bradybaena Beck, 1837 - for example: Bradybaena similaris, the Asian trampsnail
 Buliminidius Heude, 1890
 Cathaica Moellendorff, 1884
 Chosenelix Pilsbry, 1927
 Coccoglypta Pilsbry, 1895
 Ezohelix Kuroda & Emura, 1938
 Fruticicola Held, 1838 - for example Fruticicola fruticum
 Grabauia Yen, 1935
 Karaftohelix Pilsbry, 1927
 Kugitangia Schileyko, Pazilov & Abdulazizova, 2017
 Laeocathaica Moellendorff, 1899
 Metodontia Möllendorff, 1886
 Mikiria Godwin-Austen, 1918
 Neofruticicola Schileyko, Pazilov & Abdulazizova, 2020
 Neseulota Ehrmann, 1911
 Paraegista Kuroda & Azuma, 1951
 Phaeohelix Kuroda & Habe, 1949
 Ponsadenia Schileyko, 1978
 Pseudiberus Ancey, 1887
 Pseudobuliminus Gredler, 1886 - for example Pseudobuliminus incertus
 Rudens Heude, 1890
 Secusana Gredler, 1894
 Semibuliminus Möllendorff, 1899
 Stenogyropsis Möllendorff, 1899
 Stilpnodiscus Möllendorff, 1899
 Trichobradybaena M. Wu & J.-Y. Guo, 2003
 Trichocathaica Gude, 1919

tribe Euhadrini
 Euhadra Pilsbry, 1890

subfamily Helicostylinae - they are defined by the presence of one gland that is being inserted without accessory sac (Tricheulota group) or with accessory sac  (Helicostyla group).
 Calocochlia Hartmann, 1840 (nomen nudum)
 Canistrum Mörch, 1852 
Cochlostyla Pilsbry, 1895
 Dryocochlias Möllendorff, 1898
Helicostyla Férussac, 1821
Phoenicobius Mörch, 1852
 Tricheulota Pilsbry, 1895

The genus Monadenia Pilsbry, 1895 used to be placed in this family, but it has been moved to the family Xanthonychidae.

References

External links